Adolph Bergé or Adolf Pyetrovich Berzhe  (July 28, 1828, St. Petersburg – January 31, 1886, Tiflis) was an Imperial Russian bureaucrat and an Orientalist historian, with principal interests in the history and culture of the South Caucasus. He was also an archeographer and archaeologist, and served as the chairman of the Archaeographic Commission from 1864 to 1886.

A St. Petersburg native, Bergé's father was from France and his mother was from Germany. Trained in the Oriental studies at St. Petersburg University, Bergé was dispatched to the chancellery of the Viceroy of the Caucasus Prince Mikhail Vorontsov in 1851. He made two scholarly trips to Persia in 1853 and 1855. From 1864 to his death Bergé chaired the Tiflis-based Caucasian Archaeographical Commission. He died at Tiflis in 1886, leaving behind a number of works pertaining to the history of the Caucasus and Middle East, including the monumental 11-volume collection of archival documents "Acts, collected by the Archaeographical Commission at the Directorate of the Viceroy of the Caucasus" (Акты, собранные Кавказскою Археографическою коммиссиею; Tiflis, 1866–1886), the last volume of which appeared in print after Bergé's death.

References

1828 births
1886 deaths
Historians from the Russian Empire
Male writers from the Russian Empire
Russian orientalists
Writers from Saint Petersburg
Writers from Tbilisi
People from the Russian Empire of French descent
People from the Russian Empire of German descent